The Sau turaga clan is the second highest clan of the Fijian social hierarchy system. The name itself means "steward chief". Holders of such a title have the paramount role of crowning a new chief, assisting the chief and above all else defending the sovereignty of the chief. Usually the turaga clan and the sau clan are but one family, the latter being the younger sibling in the original clan of nobility. But the title holds prestige in the society as one of the closest in rank to that of the chief. Only they can make a new chief and can temporarily hold the position until one is made. The clan is the second most important in the traditional Fijian hierarchical social structure.

They are also called king makers and thus they have the most important role of installing a chief. They have gifted powers called the 'Sau', given from their Ancient creator who lives in the sea. These powers can make them foretells the future, make a curse or break them. Before they passed, their powers will be returned to the one who gave it to them and He (The Creator), will give the power of the Sau to one of the Sau Turaga clans.

See also
Fijian traditions and ceremonies

Traditions and ceremonies